Sargalm may refer to:
 Sargalm, Bandar Abbas
 Sargalm, Minab